wCoritiba Foot Ball Club is a football club based in Curitiba, Paraná. Coritiba's first trophy was the Campeonato Paranaense (Paraná State Cup), which it won against Britânia in 1916. In 1973, Coritiba won Torneio do Povo (Tournament of the People). In 1985, won the mainly tournament of Brazil, Campeonato Brasileiro.

Titles 
 Série A: 1
1985

 Série B: 2
2007, 2010

Torneio do Povo: 1
1973

Campeonato Paranaense: 38
1916, 1927, 1931, 1933, 1935, 1939, 1941, 1942, 1946, 1947, 1951, 1952, 1954, 1956, 1957, 1959, 1960, 1968, 1969, 1971, 1972, 1973, 1974, 1975, 1976, 1978, 1979, 1986, 1989, 1999, 2003, 2004, 2008, 2010, 2011, 2012, 2013, 2017

Taça Cidade de Curitiba/Taça Clemente Comandulli: 2
1976, 1978

Festival Brasileiro de Futebol: 1
1997

Fita Azul Internacional: 1
1972

Pierre Colon Trophy (Vichy, France): 1
1969

Akwaba Trophy (Africa): 1
1983

Junior Team 
Torneio Gradisca (Italia): 2
2013, 2014

Dallas Cup (United States): 2
2012, 2015

Taça Belo Horizonte de Juniores: 1
2010

Club recordsFirst match: Coritibano-Tiro Pontagrossense 0–1 (October 23, 1909)First official match: Coritiba-Ponta Grossa 5–3 (June 12, 1910)First goal scorer: Fritz EssenfelterBiggest win (National Competitions): Coritiba-Ferroviário 7–1 (Couto Pereira, April 16, 1980), Coritiba-Desportiva-ES 7–1 (Couto Pereira, May 4, 1980) & Coritiba-Palmeiras 6–0 (Couto Pereira, May 5, 2011)Heaviest defeat (national competitions): Grêmio-Coritiba 5–0 (Olímpico, February 29, 1984) & Palmeiras-Coritiba 5–0 (Parque Antártica, August 17, 1996)Most appearances (any competition): Jairo – 440 (1971–77), (1984–87)Record goal scorer: Duílio Dias – 202 (1954–64)Consecutive victories)''':Coritiba has the worldwide record of consecutive victories (24), achieved between February and May 2011.

References 

Coritiba Foot Ball Club